The AG-C/EGLM is a single shot 40 mm grenade launcher that attaches to assault rifles of various types. It is manufactured by Heckler and Koch and is derived from the AG36. EGLM stands for "Enhanced Grenade Launching Module".  A stand-alone variant exists. The device attaches under the barrel.  A separate sighting system is added to rifles fitted with the AG-C/EGLM, as the rifle's standard sights are not matched to the launcher. The AG-C/EGLM can fire high-explosive, smoke, illuminating, buckshot direct fire, CS gas, and training grenades.

Users
 - Use the AG-NL variant designed for Diemaco C7 and C8 rifles and has the designation 40 mm Granaatwerper Heckler & Koch LV.
 - AG-C under the designation L17A1 (for use with the C8SFW/L119A1 carbine) and AG-SA80 under the designation L123A3 (for use with the SA80/L85 rifle).
 - AG-HK416 on HK416 within Wojska Specjalne.
 - HK269 variant used on HK416A5 by the Portuguese Army.
 - Used on HK416 and Diemaco SFW

See also
Heckler & Koch AG36
M320 grenade launcher
M203 grenade launcher

References

External links 
 The AG-C/EGLM Grenade Launcher

40×46mm grenade launchers
Post–Cold War weapons of Germany
Teargas grenade guns
Heckler & Koch grenade launchers